Hans Lennart Häggroth (2 March 1940 – 28 August 2016) was a Swedish ice hockey player. A goaltender, he won a world and European title in 1962, finishing second at the 1963 World Championships and 1964 Olympics.

Häggroth was a back-up for Kjell Svensson, and hence capped only 65 times for the national team between 1960 and 1965. Before the 1962 World Championships, Svensson got injured, but Häggroth did fine, helping win the tournament and becoming its best goaltender. After retiring from hockey Häggroth became a social worker, helping drug addicts and alcoholics. He died on 28 August 2016 at his home.

References

1940 births
2016 deaths
Ice hockey players at the 1964 Winter Olympics
Olympic ice hockey players of Sweden
Swedish ice hockey goaltenders
Olympic medalists in ice hockey
Olympic silver medalists for Sweden
Medalists at the 1964 Winter Olympics
Skellefteå AIK players
People from Övertorneå Municipality
Sportspeople from Norrbotten County